Carl Whitney Bentzel is an American attorney and political advisor serving as a commissioner of the Federal Maritime Commission. Nominated by President Donald Trump on November 21, 2019, he was sworn in on December 9, 2019. His term is set to expire in 2024.

Education 
Bentzel earned a Bachelor of Arts degree from St. Lawrence University, a Juris Doctor from the University of Alabama School of Law, and a Master of Laws from the Tulane Admiralty Law Institute at Tulane University Law School.

Career 
Prior to serving on the Federal Maritime Commission, Bentzel was a professional staffer in both chambers of the United States Congress. He was the senior Democratic counsel to the United States Senate Committee on Commerce, Science, and Transportation after serving as the maritime policy counsel to the United States House Committee on Merchant Marine and Fisheries.

Bentzel worked as the vice president at DCI Group, a public relations firm. He also established his own consulting services company, Bentzel Strategies LLC. Bentzel was nominated by President Donald Trump to serve as a commissioner of the Federal Maritime Commission on November 21, 2019. He was sworn in on December 9, 2019.

References 

Living people
Federal Maritime Commission members
St. Lawrence University alumni
University of Alabama School of Law alumni
Tulane University Law School alumni
Maryland lawyers
Maryland Democrats
Trump administration personnel
Year of birth missing (living people)